Justin C. Fleming is a Democratic member of the Pennsylvania House of Representatives, representing the 105th District since 2023.

Fleming graduated from Susquehanna Township High School (1998) and Millersville University of Pennsylvania (2002). He served as a press officer for the Pennsylvania Emergency Management Agency, Pennsylvania Department of Labor and Industry, and Pennsylvania Department of Agriculture before working in government relations for the National Association of Social Workers, Pennsylvania Psychological Association, and Pennsylvania Partnerships for Children. In 2013, he was elected to the Susquehanna Township Board of Commissioners, representing the 8th Ward.

In 2022, Fleming was elected to the Pennsylvania House of Representatives for the 105th District, defeating Republican Therese Kenley.

External links

References 

Living people
People from Chester County, Pennsylvania
Democratic Party members of the Pennsylvania House of Representatives
African-American state legislators in Pennsylvania
21st-century American politicians
1980 births
21st-century African-American politicians
20th-century African-American people